The following is a list of characters that first appeared in the ITV soap opera Coronation Street in 2005, by order of first appearance.

Scooter Makuna

Hiren "Scooter" Makuna, first appeared in early 2005 as the boyfriend of Sarah Platt (Tina O'Brien). He was of Indian descent.

His character was mostly remembered for not being very bright, having a fondness for fish and getting great pleasure in retrieving junk from skips. Scooter and Sarah broke up in the autumn of 2005 after an argument. He left the Street soon afterwards.

Lena Thistlewood

Lena Thistlewood is a friend of Blanche Hunt (Maggie Jones), who first appears in 2005 and regularly visits the Barlow household and she takes a fancy to Ken Barlow (William Roache), Lena was attends Ken and Deirdre's second wedding in 2005. Lena dies off-screen on New Year's Day 2006 and she leaves her dog, Eccles, to Blanche.

Diggory Compton

Diggory Compton was played by Eric Potts.

When he arrives in Weatherfield with his daughter Molly (Vicky Binns), Diggory opens the local bakery shop at the end of the street. He tries wooing Liz McDonald (Beverley Callard) by inviting her to a Christmas dinner party, however she ended up meeting her future husband, drummer Vernon Tomlin (Ian Reddington) at the event. During his time in Weatherfield, Diggory befriends Mike Baldwin (Johnny Briggs). Diggory leaves Weatherfield in July 2006 after his business fails.

Molly visits him in 2008 after falling out with her fiancé Tyrone Dobbs (Alan Halsall). On 5 January 2009, Molly receives a call from the hospital that Diggory's appendix has burst. Several days later, it is revealed Diggory will recover but he will ultimately miss Molly and Tyrone's wedding due to being hospitalised for a week.

In December 2010, Diggory is informed by telephone that Molly has died in the tram crash caused by an explosion at the Joinery Bar. Diggory's sister Pam Hobsworth (Kate Anthony) tells Molly's former lover Kevin Webster (Michael Le Vell) the heartbreak of having to inform Diggory of his daughter's death saying she is wondering what words to use to break the news to him. Diggory is not seen at Molly's funeral as he is reportedly too ill to attend.

Jessie Jackson

Jessie Jackson is played by actress Nailah Cumberbatch. She arrives at Underworld with her "twin sister" Joanne (Zaraah Abrahams) to replace departing machinist Sonia Marshall (Tina Gambe) and is the more outgoing one of the two. In 2006, Danny Baldwin (Bradley Walsh) sacks Jessie after he catches her dancing on the tables, and she subsequently seeks employment as a stewardess and leaves the Street. Her "twin sister" is later revealed to be her cousin.

Joanne Jackson

Joanne Jackson was played by the actress Zaraah Abrahams. Joanne arrived at Underworld with her "twin sister" Jessie and proceeded to cause much amusement by claiming to be identical despite the obvious difference in appearance. Joanne was the shyer of the two and lacks confidence where men are concerned. Her crush, and subsequent date, with Nathan Harding (Ray Fearon) came to nothing after she was left feeling stupid and embarrassed about having a make over for someone who wasn't really interested in her.

Following his nasty break up with Leanne Battersby (Jane Danson), Jamie Baldwin (Rupert Hill) was keen to ask Joanne out on a date. After a disastrous date the two realised that they did enjoy each other's company and shared a kiss. This was followed by the promise to see each other again (unfortunately this was ruined by Jamie's problems with his alcoholic mother, Carol (Lynne Pearson) and they decided against starting a new romance so soon after his break up with Leanne). She was also gutted when Jessie was sacked from Underworld and left to become an air hostess. When Kelly Crabtree (Tupele Dorgu) took Joanne under her wing, Kelly's obsessed "friend" Becky Granger (Katherine Kelly) threatened her, scaring Joanne half to death. When Kelly was set up for stealing at the factory by unhinged Becky, Joanne was the only person who believed Kelly was innocent and was instrumental in convincing the other factory workers that it was Becky, not Kelly who was to blame. For most of 2006, Joanne dated Adam Barlow (Sam Robertson). However, she kissed her new factory boss, Liam Connor (Rob James-Collier) (who, incidentally, Adam sold his half of the factory to) and had a fling with him, despite Kelly being sure that Liam fancied her, she soon dumped Adam with a text message. In April 2007 she revealed to Hayley Cropper (Julie Hesmondhalgh) that she was an illegal immigrant, brought over from Liberia at the age of 8, and that her "twin sister" is in fact her cousin, and was soon arrested as immigration officers raided the Factory. In June 2007, Joanne was released from Immigration Detention and resumed her job at underworld for around two weeks, until Carla Connor (Alison King), the majority owner of underworld, fired her claiming that the factory is over-staffed and that Joanne was the most recent employee, regardless of the fact she had worked at the factory for over three years previously. Joanne later blackmailed Carla and Liam by threatening to take them to a tribunal for unfair dismissal and sexual harassment. They gave her £5,000 to keep her mouth shut, and she left the area.

Jean Harris

Jean Harris is the mother of Tommy Harris (Thomas Craig). Jean arrives to attend Tommy's funeral in 2005 and is angered to discover that he is being buried as opposed to his wishes of being cremated.

Keith Appleyard 

Keith Appleyard is played by Ian Redford. Keith is Angela Harris's (Kathryn Hunt) father. When she and her family live in Sheffield, she witnesses a murder. Keith persuades Angela to tell the truth and testify at the trial, which results in their move to Weatherfield under the witness protection scheme. They are also given a new name - Nelson - but don't use it for long.

Keith first appears in 2005 to help Angela after her husband Tommy (Thomas Craig) dies. He stays to look after his grandchildren Katy (Lucy-Jo Hudson) and Craig (Richard Fleeshman) after Angela is arrested for Tommy's murder. Katy (the real killer) commits suicide, unable to handle the guilt, and Angela is imprisoned for helping Katy cover up the crime. Keith stays with Craig in Coronation Street, rather than insist Craig join him in Sheffield, feeling Craig has suffered enough - plus, Weatherfield is closer than Sheffield to where Angela is in prison.

After moving in, Keith dates hairdresser Audrey Roberts (Sue Nicholls), who is his opposite in many ways. Keith is always watching the pennies and takes on a paper round to earn some extra money. His hobbies include taxidermy.

Keith is widowed, his wife having died between 2003 and 2005. Angela telephones her mother on Christmas Day 2002, and visits her in September 2003, but she has died by the time Keith arrives in 2005.

After he and Audrey end things as they are so different, Keith became enemies with builder Charlie Stubbs (Bill Ward). Charlie bills Keith for repairing the leak on the roof but Keith refuses to pay the bill, feeling Charlie has overcharged. In revenge, Charlie removes the roof tiles, insisting he will replace them when Keith pays his bill. Keith rings the police but the police say they can't help as it isn't a police matter. Keith is delighted to see Charlie replacing the tiles, thinking that he has won, until Charlie reveals that he is his new landlord. Keith is horrified and says that the landlord would have told him but Charlie says that he asked the former landlord to let him do that. Charlie's girlfriend, Tracy Barlow (Kate Ford), is delighted. She thinks, when Charlie tells Keith and Craig that he wants them out, that he intends to live there.

Keith decides that he and Craig will move to Sheffield but Craig doesn't want to leave Coronation Street as his girlfriend, Rosie (Helen Flanagan), lives there too. Initially Keith agrees to stay but after an angina attack, he is told by the doctor that it is a warning and things have to change. Keith tells Craig that they are moving to Bournemouth with Keith's sister, Marjorie. Craig is determined that he won't leave the street but Keith and Rosie's mother Sally (Sally Dynevor) persuade him and they leave.

Keith later returns to the Street when Craig runs away from Bournemouth and refuses to return there.

Nathan Harding

Nathan Harding is played by Ray Fearon. He first appears in 2005 when Kevin Webster (Michael Le Vell) is looking for a new mechanic, following the death of Tommy Harris (Thomas Craig). Nathan leaves the job after breaking up with his girlfriend Frankie Baldwin (Debra Stephenson) largely to do with the fact her ex-husband, Danny (Bradley Walsh) is still in the picture. In his final scene he punches Danny as he leaves the cobbles. He had previously romanced factory machinist Joanne Jackson (Zaraah Abrahams) as well as Tracy Barlow (Kate Ford), while he also enjoyed a brief flirtation with hairdresser Maria Sutherland (Samia Ghadie) in The Rovers Return Inn. His fiery temperament is revealed when he almost blinds Ashley Peacock (Steven Arnold) when they argue over their women while giving him boxing lessons.

Louise Hazel

Louise Hazel meets Steve McDonald (Simon Gregson) on the Red Rec. He is immediately attracted to her and when she says she's going into town he organises a free taxi. Steve is delighted the taxi driver gives him a note from Louise with her phone number on it. On 3 April 2005, Louise enjoys a drink with Steve, much to the indignation of his ex Tracy Barlow (Kate Ford). Louise is unfazed by Tracy and tells her to move on and leave her and Steve alone. Steve keeps Louise waiting in the pub while he comforts Tracy following the sudden death of her father Ray Langton (Neville Buswell). When he finally arrives at the Rovers and convinces Louise to go home with him and the couple then sleep together. On 13 April 2005, Louise shares a sad farewell with Steve as she has to return to Ireland. Louise returns to the Street on 12 June 2005, as she is visiting relatives and calls to Steve, who is delighted. However, Tracy threatens Louise telling her to leave Steve alone.

Mel Hutchwright

Mr. Wong

Mr Wong is the owner of the chip shop on Rosamund Street, who hires Cilla Battersby-Brown (Wendi Peters) and Yana Lumb (Jayne Bickerton) to work for him. He speaks very limited English and is frequently seen arguing with Cilla.

Carol Baldwin

Carol Baldwin (née Saunders) was played by Lynne Pearson.

Carol is the first wife of Danny (Bradley Walsh), and the mother of Jamie (Rupert Hill). While she is still married to Danny, he is sleeping with her son's babysitter Frankie (Debra Stephenson). Carol is oblivious to this, as she completely trusted Frankie; she only finds out when Danny leaves her to marry Frankie, taking Jamie with him.

Jamie doesn't see Carol for many years; he is raised by Danny and Frankie. In 2005, he tracks down Carol to Birmingham and decides to pay her a visit. It soon becomes clear that past events have affected Carol's life very badly; she has never remarried, is living in a run down flat, and is an alcoholic with no job or money. Jamie becomes very concerned for his mother and visits her many times in Birmingham; she appears in Weatherfield for the first time for Jamie's 25th birthday party, much to the horror of her ex-husband, Danny, and his wife, Frankie.

Carol appears regularly for months, and when Danny begins an affair with his girlfriend, Leanne (Jane Danson), Carol was the one who tells Jamie.

When Frankie and Danny split up, Carol moves in with them to be closer to Jamie and he makes her promise to give up alcohol. However, in January 2006, Jamie and Frankie throw Carol out when she accuses them of sleeping together (which is somewhat prophetic, as later that year Jamie and Frankie pursue an affair), and her drinking continues.

In 2007, it becomes apparent that Carol has ditched the drink, and is now engaged. On 25 September 2007, Jamie and Violet Wilson (Jenny Platt) attend Carol's wedding.

Lloyd Mullaney

Viv Baldwin

Vivian "Viv" Baldwin is the mother of Danny Baldwin (Bradley Walsh). She is first seen on the street in July 2005, following her husband Harry's death and later revealing to her brother-in-law Mike (Johnny Briggs) that he is in fact Danny's biological father, not Harry.

Viv makes a reappearance in Weatherfield at Christmas 2005, when the family go out to Christmas dinner.

In December 2006, she returns enquiring about her son's disappearance, only to find out the truth about her grandson Jamie's (Rupert Hill) affair with his former stepmother Frankie Baldwin (Debra Stephenson). After finding this, Viv storms back home to London.

Freda Burgess

Freda Burgess, played by Ali Briggs, is the deaf niece of Ernest Bishop (Stephen Hancock). In August 2005, Freda came to visit her aunt Emily Bishop (Eileen Derbyshire), but got a frosty reception from Emily's lodger, Norris Cole (Malcolm Hebden), who thought she was after Emily's money. Freda helped Emily when she fell down the stairs and sprained her ankle, but left due to Norris' treatment of her.

In July 2009, Freda returned. She revealed to Emily that she was engaged, but her fiancé was in prison. She took a dislike to Emily's new friend, Ramsay Clegg (Andrew Sachs), as she found his over-eagerness to please everyone annoying. Norris was thrilled, as he disliked his brother too and felt they had something in common. After staying a few days, Freda left again.

On 3 May 2019, Freda returns to sell Emily and Norris' house, leading to Mary Cole (Patti Clare) accusing Freda of murdering Norris, who later turns up to announce that he and Freda are getting married and moving to Scotland. In 2020, Freda and Norris are shown to be living in Stillwaters, a gated community.

Freda reappears again in June 2021 when discussing the pros and cons of Baby Aled’s hearing operation with Gemma Winter (Dolly-Rose Campbell) and Chesney Brown (Sam Aston). Three months later, Freda meets Mary, Ken Barlow (William Roache) and Rita Tanner (Barbara Knox) at Weatherfield General to tell them Norris has died, following a stroke. She is still in contact with Gemma and Chesney, because in 2022 it is mentioned that she is looking after the quads and Chesney's son Joseph while everyone is out celebrating Gemma and Paul Foreman's (Peter Ash) birthday.

Phil Nail

Phil Nail, is played by Scottish actor Clive Russell, Phil works at the Medical Centre on Rosamund Street as a reflexologist. He quickly begins a relationship with receptionist Gail Platt (Helen Worth).

Phil is very interested in the Platt family's experience with Richard Hillman (Brian Capron) because he is undertaking a Criminology course. Gail trusts Phil; she even allows him to record interviews with her children about their experiences with Richard.

Gail's son David Platt (Jack P. Shepherd) does not like Phil; in fact, he despises him knowing that Phil is only wanting to know about Richard and that he does not care about Gail's children. He even begins a campaign to stop the relationship between Phil and Gail. One such example is when Phil's hand is badly injured when David intentionally slams it with a car boot lid. Another is where Phil pins David up against a wall and threatens him. David has become unhappy ever since his father Martin (Sean Wilson) has left and he does not like another man in the house telling him what to do, as that is his father's job. Eventually, Phil leaves the street after Gail discovers that Phil attacked David.

Phil is a suspect when Gail began receiving a series of hoax letters claiming to be from the deceased Richard in 2006. The culprit is later revealed to have been David.

Zack

Zack is a psychiatrist who treats Shelley Unwin (Sally Lindsay) when her anxiety overtakes so much of her life that she is rarely able to leave her own room. Zack helps Shelley slowly go back to the outside world, but Shelley's boyfriend Charlie Stubbs (Bill Ward) resents Zack's efforts to help, and eventually convinces Shelley to stop seeing him. Shelley progresses far enough that she manages to dump Charlie moments before she is to become his wife. After getting away from Charlie, she calls Zack to tell him the news. He says that he is proud of her, and both agree to continue therapy until she is fully recovered.

Molly Dobbs

Robyn Platt

Robyn Platt is played by Clare Calbraith. Robyn is the girlfriend (and later wife) of Martin Platt (Sean Wilson). She made her first appearance on 23 September 2005 and made her last appearance on 9 November 2005. She was portrayed by Claire Calbraith.

In September 2005, Robyn made her first appearance as a mascot. However, the actress who portrayed her, Clare Calbraith, was uncredited although it still counted as her first appearance.

A month later, in October 2005, Robyn reappeared and she and Martin began a relationship. However, Robyn thought Martin was stringing her along and dumped him at the Rovers Return Inn over her suspicions but they soon reconciled that month.

Martin began to reject his son, David Platt (Jack P. Shepherd), for Robyn and at 8 Coronation Street, which was holding a farewell bombfire for Martin and Robyn, who were leaving for a new life in Liverpool in November, David realised that Martin wanted Robyn and not him. David's mother and Martin's ex-wife, Gail Platt (Helen Worth), and Robyn were furious with Martin for this and Martin decided to make it up to him by spending time with him but David rejected his father. However, he and Martin reconciled before he departed for Liverpool with Robyn. David told Robyn to take good care of his father; Robyn replied that she will. David visited Martin and Robin in January 2006 and revealed that Robyn was pregnant with Martin's baby and their daughter was born later that year.

Ronnie Clayton

Veronica "Ronnie" Clayton is played by Emma Stansfield. Ronnie, as she likes to be known, first appears on the show in late October 2005. She used to be married to gangster Jimmy Clayton (David Crellin) and works for his cab firm. In an attempt to escape his bullying nature, she leaves him and starts working under Steve McDonald (Simon Gregson) at Streetcars. Steve and Ronnie start a relationship, but Ronnie's presence puts the entire Streetcars workforce under risk from the vengeful Jimmy. Ronnie refuses to back down and go back to him, with Steve supporting her.

Jimmy is eventually able to trick Ronnie into driving out to a deserted farm. He holds her at gunpoint, and she agrees to give their marriage another try when he nearly kills her and Steve. Lloyd Mullaney (Craig Charles) rescues them, but Ronnie is then distant with Steve since the ordeal. She moves out of his house and into a flat of her own to show her independence.

On 31 May 2006, after having a row with Steve, Ronnie calls Steve on her mobile phone whilst driving, and not concentrating on the road, runs over an innocent elderly man and kills him. Instead of calling an ambulance, Ronnie drives away. The next day Ronnie sees in the paper the news about the dead man and feels even more guilty. She tries to blame Steve and Les Battersby for the accident, but is eventually caught and arrested, A month later, she is sentenced to 25 years imprisonment.

Billy Brown

William "Billy" Brown  is the eldest son of Cilla Battersby-Brown (Wendi Peters), who attends her wedding to Les Battersby (Bruce Jones) on 31 October 2005 and informs his mother that he is joining the army. Billy is more recently mentioned when younger brother Chesney Brown (Sam Aston) runs away from home to visit him in 2009.

Amber Kalirai

Ravinder Kalirai

Ravinder Kalirai is the mother of Amber Kalirai (Nikki Patel), who first appears in 2005 and tells her the truth about her father Dev Alahan (Jimmi Harkishin). During the summer of 2006, Ravinder meets a new man and decides relocate to Finland with him. After falling out with Dev, Amber goes to stay with Ravinder for several weeks in November 2008.

Nicolette Seddon

Nicolette Seddon is the daughter of Sally Webster's (Sally Dynevor) cousin, Paul (Ken Bradshaw). This is revealed when Sally's daughter Sophie (Brooke Vincent) brings her home one day as a new friend and they mention they had traced their family trees and discovered they are related. Sally sees Nicolette as a bad influence on Sophie and later visits Nicolette's house - when she discovers that Nicolette's father is successful and wealthy, much to her chagrin. After a heated exchange with Paul and his wife Suzanne (Fiona Gillies), Sally decides not to keep in touch with that branch of the Seddon family tree.

Vernon Tomlin

Eric Talford

Eric Talford is the owner of the bookies on Rosamund Street who first appears in December 2005 and becomes the boss and love interest of Carol Baldwin (Lynne Pearson).

References 

2005
, Coronation Street
Coronation Street